Virbia underwoodi is a moth in the family Erebidae first described by Herbert Druce in 1911. It is found in Costa Rica.

References

underwoodi
Moths described in 1911